Parotocinclus bahiensis is a species of catfish in the family Loricariidae. It is native to South America, where it occurs in the state of Bahia in Brazil, for which it is named. It is a tropical freshwater species that reaches 3.1 cm (1.2 inches) SL.

References 

Loricariidae
Otothyrinae
Fish described in 1918
Freshwater fish of Brazil